Nepal competed at the 2020 Summer Paralympics in Tokyo, Japan, originally scheduled to take place in 2020 but postponed to 23 July to 8 August 2021 because of the COVID-19 pandemic.

Taekwondo

Nepal qualified one athlete to compete at the Paralympics competition. Palesha Goverdhan qualified by receiving the bipartite commission invitation allocation quota.

See also
 Nepal at the 2020 Summer Olympics

References

Nations at the 2020 Summer Paralympics
2020
2021 in Nepalese sport